A flechette is a pointed steel projectile with a vaned tail for stable flight. The name comes from French , "little arrow" or "dart", and sometimes retains the acute accent in English: fléchette. They have been used as ballistic weapons since World War I. Delivery systems and methods of launching flechettes vary, from a single shot, to thousands in a single explosive round. The use of flechettes as antipersonnel weapons has been controversial.

Air-dropped

During World War I, flechettes were dropped from aircraft to attack infantry and were able to pierce helmets.

The weapons were designed to be dropped from an aircraft. They contained no explosive charge but as they fell they developed significant kinetic energy making them lethal and able to easily penetrate soft cover such as jungle canopy, several inches of sand or light armor. Lazy Dog munitions were simple and cheap; they could be dropped in huge numbers in a pass. Though their effects were often no less indiscriminate than other projectiles, they did not leave unexploded ordnance (UXO) that could be active years after a conflict ended. Lazy Dog projectiles were used primarily during the Korean and Vietnam Wars.

Small-arms ammunition

The excellent ballistic performance and armor-piercing potential of flechettes have made the development and integration of this class of munition attractive to small-arms manufacturers.  A number of attempts have been made to field flechette-firing small arms.

Work at Johns Hopkins University in the 1950s led to the development of the direct injection antipersonnel chemical biological agent (DIACBA), where flechettes were grooved, hollow pointed, or otherwise milled to retain a quantity of chemical or biological warfare agent to be delivered through a ballistic wound. The initial work was with the nerve agent VX, which had to be thickened to deliver a reliable dose. Eventually this was replaced by a particulate carbamate. The US Biological Program also had a microflechette to deliver either botulinum toxin A or saxitoxin, the M1 biodart, which resembled a 7.62 mm rifle cartridge. The USSR had the AO-27 rifle as well as the APS amphibious rifle, and other countries have their own flechette rounds.

A number of prototype flechette-firing weapons were developed as part of the long-running Special Purpose Individual Weapon (SPIW) project. The Steyr-Mannlicher ACR rifle was a prototype flechette-firing assault rifle built for the US Army's Advanced Combat Rifle program of 1989–90.

A variation of the flechette addressing its difficulties is the SCMITR, developed as part of the Close Assault Weapon System, or CAWS, project. Selective-fire shotguns were used to fire flechettes designed to retain the exterior ballistics and penetration of standard flechettes, but increase wounding capacity through a wider wound path.

Shotguns
During the Vietnam War the United States employed 12-gauge combat shotguns using flechette loads. These plastic-cased shells were issued on a limited trial basis during the Vietnam War. The flechettes were packed in a plastic cup with granulated white polyethylene to maintain alignment with the bore axis, and supported by a metal disk to prevent penetration of the over-powder wad during acceleration down the bore. Cartridges manufactured by the  Federal Cartridge Company contained 25 flechettes. The tips of the flechettes are exposed in the Federal cartridges, but concealed by a conventional star crimp in WCC's cartridges. The flechettes had flatter trajectories over longer ranges than spherical buckshot, but combat effectiveness did not justify continued production.

Rocket and artillery use
Smaller flechettes were used in special artillery shells called "beehive" rounds (so named for the very distinctive whistling buzz made by thousands of flechettes flying downrange at supersonic speeds) and intended for use against troops in the open – a ballistic shell packed with flechettes was fired and set off by a mechanical time fuse, scattering flechettes in an expanding cone.

During the Vietnam War 105 mm howitzer batteries and tanks (90 mm guns) used flechette rounds to defend themselves against massed infantry attacks. The ubiquitous 106 mm M40 recoilless rifle was primarily used as an anti-tank weapon. However, it could also be used in an anti-personnel role with the use of flechette rounds. The widely used Carl Gustaf 8.4 cm recoilless rifle also uses an Area Defence Munition designed as a close-range anti-personnel round. It fires 1,100 flechettes over a wide area. The US Air Force used  rockets with WDU-4/A flechette warheads.

The 70 mm Hydra 70 rocket currently in service with the US Armed forces can be fitted with an anti-personnel (APERS) warhead containing 1,179 flechettes. They are carried by attack helicopters such as the AH-64 Apache and the AH-1 Cobra.

Russo-Ukrainian war 

Flechettes have been used during the 2022 Russian invasion of Ukraine, where samples of the projectiles were recovered in the mass graves in Bucha. A witness described munitions bursting overhead and littering the area with 3 cm flechettes. A British munitions expert reviewed photographs of the flechettes and concluded that they likely came from a 122 mm 3Sh1 artillery round. A speaker for the Ukrainian Ground Forces stated that Ukraine's military does not use shells with flechettes.

See also
 Kinetic energy penetrator

References

Bibliography

External links

 "How flechettes work"—The Guardian newspaper
 Missiles and Flechettes —Pictures of air dropped flechettes, from World War I through the 1970s at big-ordnance.com

Ammunition
Flechette firearms
Projectiles
Shotgun shells